Ohio was admitted to the Union on March 1, 1803, and elects U.S. senators to Class 1 and Class 3. Its current U.S. senators are Democrat Sherrod Brown (serving since 2007) and Republican J. D. Vance (serving since 2023), making it one of six states to have a split United States Senate delegation; these states being Maine, Montana, Ohio itself, Vermont, West Virginia, and Wisconsin. Not counting Vermont, where Independents have caucused with the Democrats since 2001, Ohio has had the longest current split delegation, having had two senators from the opposite parties since 2007. John Sherman was Ohio's longest-serving senator (1861–1877; 1881–1897).

List of senators

|- style="height:2em"
! rowspan=3 | 1
| rowspan=3 align=left | John Smith
| rowspan=3  | Democratic-Republican
| rowspan=3 nowrap | Apr 1, 1803 –Apr 25, 1808
| rowspan=3 | Elected in 1803.Resigned.
| rowspan=5 | 1
| 
| rowspan=2 | 1
| rowspan=2 | Elected in 1803.Retired.
| rowspan=2 nowrap | Apr 1, 1803 –Mar 3, 1807
| rowspan=2  | Democratic-Republican
| rowspan=2 align=right | Thomas Worthington
! rowspan=2 | 1

|- style="height:2em"
| 

|- style="height:2em"
| 
| rowspan=9 | 2
| rowspan=3 | Elected in 1807.Resigned.
| rowspan=3 nowrap | Mar 4, 1807 –Mar 3, 1809
| rowspan=3  | Democratic-Republican
| rowspan=3 align=right | Edward Tiffin
! rowspan=3 | 2

|- style="height:2em"
| colspan=3 | Vacant
| nowrap | Apr 25, 1808 –Dec 12, 1808
|  

|- style="height:2em"
! rowspan=3 | 2
| rowspan=3 align=left | Return J. Meigs Jr.
| rowspan=3  | Democratic-Republican
| rowspan=3 nowrap | Dec 12, 1808 –Dec 8, 1810
| Elected in 1808 to finish Smith's term.

|- style="height:2em"
| rowspan=2 | Elected in 1808 to full term.Resigned to become Governor of Ohio.
| rowspan=9 | 2
| 
|  
| nowrap | Mar 4, 1809 –May 18, 1809
| colspan=3 | Vacant

|- style="height:2em"
| rowspan=2 | Appointed to finish Tiffin's term.Retired when successor elected.
| rowspan=2 nowrap | May 18, 1809 –Dec 11, 1809
| rowspan=2  | Democratic-Republican
| rowspan=2 align=right | Stanley Griswold
! rowspan=2 | 3

|- style="height:2em"
| rowspan=2 colspan=3 | Vacant
| rowspan=2 nowrap | Dec 8, 1810 –Dec 15, 1810
| rowspan=2 |  

|- style="height:2em"
| rowspan=3 | Elected to finish Tiffin's term.Retired.
| rowspan=3 nowrap | Dec 11, 1809 –Mar 3, 1813
| rowspan=3  | Democratic-Republican
| rowspan=3 align=right | Alexander Campbell
! rowspan=3 | 4

|- style="height:2em"
! rowspan=3 | 3
| rowspan=3 align=left | Thomas Worthington
| rowspan=3  | Democratic-Republican
| rowspan=3 nowrap | Dec 15, 1810 –Dec 1, 1814
| rowspan=3 | Elected to finish Meigs's term.Resigned to become Governor of Ohio.

|- style="height:2em"
| 

|- style="height:2em"
| 
| rowspan=5 | 3
| rowspan=5 | Elected in 1813.Retired.
| rowspan=5 nowrap | Mar 4, 1813 –Mar 3, 1819
| rowspan=5  | Democratic-Republican
| rowspan=5 align=right | Jeremiah Morrow
! rowspan=5 | 5

|- style="height:2em"
| colspan=3 | Vacant
| nowrap | Dec 1, 1814 –Dec 10, 1814
|  

|- style="height:2em"
! 4
| align=left | Joseph Kerr
|  | Democratic-Republican
| nowrap | Dec 10, 1814 –Mar 3, 1815
| Elected to finish Worthington's term.Retired.

|- style="height:2em"
! rowspan=13 | 5
| rowspan=13 align=left | Benjamin Ruggles
| rowspan=7  | Democratic-Republican
| rowspan=13 nowrap | Mar 4, 1815 –Mar 3, 1833
| rowspan=3 | Elected in 1815.
| rowspan=3 | 3
| 

|- style="height:2em"
| 

|- style="height:2em"
| 
| rowspan=5 | 4
| rowspan=2 | Elected in 1819.Died.
| rowspan=2 nowrap | Mar 4, 1819 –Dec 13, 1821
| rowspan=2  | Democratic-Republican
| rowspan=2 align=right | William A. Trimble
! rowspan=2 | 6

|- style="height:2em"
| rowspan=5 | Re-elected in 1821.
| rowspan=5 | 4
| 

|- style="height:2em"
|  
| nowrap | Dec 13, 1821 –Jan 3, 1822
| colspan=3 | Vacant

|- style="height:2em"
| rowspan=2 | Elected to finish Trimble's term.Lost re-election.
| rowspan=2 nowrap | Jan 3, 1822 –Mar 3, 1825
| rowspan=2  | Democratic-Republican
| rowspan=2 align=right | Ethan Allen Brown
! rowspan=2 | 7

|- style="height:2em"
| 

|- style="height:2em"
| rowspan=6  | NationalRepublican
| 
| rowspan=5 | 5
| rowspan=2 | Elected in 1824.Resigned to become U.S. Minister to Colombia.
| rowspan=2 nowrap | Mar 4, 1825 –May 20, 1828
| rowspan=2  | NationalRepublican
| rowspan=2 align=right | William Henry Harrison
! rowspan=2 | 8

|- style="height:2em"
| rowspan=5 | Re-elected in 1827.Retired.
| rowspan=5 | 5
| 

|- style="height:2em"
|  
| nowrap | May 20, 1828 –Dec 10, 1828
| colspan=3 | Vacant

|- style="height:2em"
| rowspan=2 | Elected to finish Harrison's term.Retired.
| rowspan=2 nowrap | Dec 10, 1828 –Mar 3, 1831
| rowspan=2  | NationalRepublican
| rowspan=2 align=right | Jacob Burnet
! rowspan=2 | 9

|- style="height:2em"
| 

|- style="height:2em"
| 
| rowspan=3 | 6
| rowspan=3 | Elected in 1830.Lost re-election.
| rowspan=3 nowrap | Mar 4, 1831 –Mar 3, 1837
| rowspan=3  | NationalRepublican
| rowspan=3 align=right | Thomas Ewing
! rowspan=3 | 10

|- style="height:2em"
! rowspan=3 | 6
| rowspan=3 align=left | Thomas Morris
| rowspan=2  | Jacksonian
| rowspan=3 nowrap | Mar 4, 1833 –Mar 3, 1839
| rowspan=3 | Elected in 1833.Lost re-election.
| rowspan=3 | 6
| 

|- style="height:2em"
| 

|- style="height:2em"
|  | Democratic
| 
| rowspan=3 | 7
| rowspan=3 | Elected in 1837.
| rowspan=6 nowrap | Mar 4, 1837 –Mar 3, 1849
| rowspan=6  | Democratic
| rowspan=6 align=right | William Allen
! rowspan=6 | 11

|- style="height:2em"
! rowspan=3 | 7
| rowspan=3 align=left | Benjamin Tappan
| rowspan=3  | Democratic
| rowspan=3 nowrap | Mar 4, 1839 –Mar 3, 1845
| rowspan=3 | Elected in 1838.Retired.
| rowspan=3 | 7
| 

|- style="height:2em"
| 

|- style="height:2em"
| 
| rowspan=3 | 8
| rowspan=3 | Re-elected in 1842.Lost re-election.

|- style="height:2em"
! rowspan=3 | 8
| rowspan=3 align=left | Thomas Corwin
| rowspan=3  | Whig
| rowspan=3 nowrap | Mar 4, 1845 –Jul 20, 1850
| rowspan=3 | Elected in 1844.Resigned to become U.S. Secretary of the Treasury.
| rowspan=4 | 8
| 

|- style="height:2em"
| 

|- style="height:2em"
| 
| rowspan=5 | 9
| rowspan=5 | Elected in 1849.Retired.
| rowspan=5 nowrap | Mar 4, 1849 –Mar 3, 1855
| rowspan=5  | Free Soil
| rowspan=5 align=right | Salmon P. Chase
! rowspan=5 | 12

|- style="height:2em"
! 9
| align=left | Thomas Ewing
|  | Whig
| nowrap | Jul 20, 1850 –Mar 3, 1851
| Appointed to finish Corwin's term.Lost election to the next term.

|- style="height:2em"
| colspan=3 | Vacant
| nowrap | Mar 4, 1851 –Mar 15, 1851
|  
| rowspan=4 | 9
| 

|- style="height:2em"
! rowspan=11 | 10
| rowspan=11 align=left | Benjamin Wade
| rowspan=2  | Whig
| rowspan=11 nowrap | Mar 15, 1851 –Mar 3, 1869
| rowspan=3 | Elected late in 1851.

|- style="height:2em"
| 

|- style="height:2em"
| rowspan=9  | Republican
| 
| rowspan=3 | 10
| rowspan=3 | Elected in 1854Lost re-election.
| rowspan=3 nowrap | Mar 4, 1855 –Mar 3, 1861
| rowspan=3  | Democratic
| rowspan=3 align=right | George E. Pugh
! rowspan=3 | 13

|- style="height:2em"
| rowspan=5 | Re-elected in 1856.
| rowspan=5 | 10
| 

|- style="height:2em"
| 

|- style="height:2em"
| 
| rowspan=5 | 11
| Elected in 1860.Resigned to become U.S. Secretary of the Treasury.
| nowrap | Mar 4, 1861 –Mar 6, 1861
|  | Republican
| align=right | Salmon P. Chase
! 14

|- style="height:2em"
|  
| nowrap | Mar 6, 1861 –Mar 21, 1861
| colspan=3 | Vacant

|- style="height:2em"
| rowspan=3 | Elected to finish Chase's term.
| rowspan=9 nowrap | Mar 21, 1861 –Mar 8, 1877
| rowspan=9  | Republican
| rowspan=9 align=right | John Sherman
! rowspan=9 | 15

|- style="height:2em"
| rowspan=3 | Re-elected in 1863.Lost renomination.
| rowspan=3 | 11
| 

|- style="height:2em"
| 

|- style="height:2em"
| 
| rowspan=3 | 12
| rowspan=3 | Re-elected in 1866.

|- style="height:2em"
! rowspan=8 | 11
| rowspan=8 align=left | Allen G. Thurman
| rowspan=8  | Democratic
| rowspan=8 nowrap | Mar 4, 1869 –Mar 3, 1881
| rowspan=3 | Elected in 1868.
| rowspan=3 | 12
| 

|- style="height:2em"
| 

|- style="height:2em"
| 
| rowspan=5 | 13
| rowspan=3 | Re-elected in 1872.Resigned to become U.S. Secretary of the Treasury.

|- style="height:2em"
| rowspan=5 | Re-elected in 1874.Lost re-election.
| rowspan=5 | 13
| 

|- style="height:2em"
| 

|- style="height:2em"
|  
| nowrap | Mar 8, 1877 –Mar 21, 1877
| colspan=3 | Vacant

|- style="height:2em"
| Elected to finish Sherman's term.Retired.
| nowrap | Mar 21, 1877 –Mar 3, 1879
|  | Republican
| align=right | Stanley Matthews
! 16

|- style="height:2em"
| 
| rowspan=3 | 14
| rowspan=3 | Election date unknown.Lost renominiation.
| rowspan=3 nowrap | Mar 4, 1879 –Mar 3, 1885
| rowspan=3  | Democratic
| rowspan=3 align=right | George H. Pendleton
! rowspan=3 | 17

|- style="height:2em"
! rowspan=9 | 12
| rowspan=9 align=left | John Sherman
| rowspan=9  | Republican
| rowspan=9 nowrap | Mar 4, 1881 –Mar 4, 1897
| rowspan=3 | Elected in 1881.
| rowspan=3 | 14
| 

|- style="height:2em"
| 

|- style="height:2em"
| 
| rowspan=3 | 15
| rowspan=3 | Elected in 1884.Retired.
| rowspan=3 nowrap | Mar 4, 1885 –Mar 3, 1891
| rowspan=3  | Democratic
| rowspan=3 align=right | Henry B. Payne
! rowspan=3 | 18

|- style="height:2em"
| rowspan=3 | Re-elected in 1886.
| rowspan=3 | 15
| 

|- style="height:2em"
| 

|- style="height:2em"
| 
| rowspan=3 | 16
| rowspan=3 | Elected in 1890.Lost re-election.
| rowspan=3 nowrap | Mar 4, 1891 –Mar 3, 1897
| rowspan=3  | Democratic
| rowspan=3 align=right | Calvin S. Brice
! rowspan=3 | 19

|- style="height:2em"
| rowspan=3 | Re-elected in 1892.Resigned to become U.S. Secretary of State.
| rowspan=4 | 16
| 

|- style="height:2em"
| 

|- style="height:2em"
| 
| rowspan=4 | 17
| rowspan=4 | Elected in 1896.
| rowspan=9 nowrap | Mar 4, 1897 –Mar 3, 1909
| rowspan=9  | Republican
| rowspan=9 align=right | Joseph B. Foraker
! rowspan=9 | 20

|- style="height:2em"
! rowspan=4 | 13
| rowspan=4 align=left | Mark Hanna
| rowspan=4  | Republican
| rowspan=4 nowrap | Mar 5, 1897 –Feb 15, 1904
| Appointed to continue Sherman's term.Elected in 1898 to finish Sherman's term.

|- style="height:2em"
| rowspan=3 | Elected in 1898 to the next term.Died.
| rowspan=5 | 17
| 

|- style="height:2em"
| 

|- style="height:2em"
| 
| rowspan=5 | 18
| rowspan=5 | Re-elected in 1902.Retired.

|- style="height:2em"
| colspan=3 | Vacant
| nowrap | Feb 15, 1904 –Mar 23, 1904
|  

|- style="height:2em"
! rowspan=4 | 14
| rowspan=4 align=left | Charles W. F. Dick
| rowspan=4  | Republican
| rowspan=4 nowrap | Mar 23, 1904 –Mar 3, 1911
| Elected in 1904 to finish Hanna's term.

|- style="height:2em"
| rowspan=3 | Elected in 1904 to the next term.Lost re-election.
| rowspan=3 | 18
| 

|- style="height:2em"
| 

|- style="height:2em"
| 
| rowspan=3 | 19
| rowspan=3 | Elected Jan 12, 1909.Retired.
| rowspan=3 nowrap | Mar 4, 1909 –Mar 3, 1915
| rowspan=3  | Republican
| rowspan=3 align=right | Theodore E. Burton
! rowspan=3 | 21

|- style="height:2em"
! rowspan=7 | 15
| rowspan=7 align=left | Atlee Pomerene
| rowspan=7  | Democratic
| rowspan=7 nowrap | Mar 4, 1911 –Mar 3, 1923
| rowspan=3 | Elected Jan 10, 1911.
| rowspan=3 | 19
| 

|- style="height:2em"
| 

|- style="height:2em"
| 
| rowspan=4 | 20
| rowspan=3 | Elected in 1914.Retired to run for U.S. President.Resigned to become U.S. President.
| rowspan=3 nowrap | Mar 4, 1915 –Jan 13, 1921
| rowspan=3  | Republican
| rowspan=3 align=right | Warren G. Harding
! rowspan=3 | 22

|- style="height:2em"
| rowspan=4 | Re-elected in 1916.Lost re-election.
| rowspan=4 | 20
| 

|- style="height:2em"
| 

|- style="height:2em"
| Appointed to finish Harding's term, having been elected to the next term.
| rowspan=5 nowrap | Jan 14, 1921 –Mar 30, 1928
| rowspan=5  | Republican
| rowspan=5 align=right | Frank B. Willis
! rowspan=5 | 23

|- style="height:2em"
| 
| rowspan=3 | 21
| rowspan=3 | Elected in 1920.

|- style="height:2em"
! rowspan=12 | 16
| rowspan=12 align=left | Simeon D. Fess
| rowspan=12  | Republican
| rowspan=12 nowrap | Mar 4, 1923 –Jan 3, 1935
| rowspan=6 | Elected in 1922.
| rowspan=6 | 21
| 

|- style="height:2em"
| 

|- style="height:2em"
| 
| rowspan=9 | 22
| Re-elected in 1926.Died.

|- style="height:2em"
|  
| nowrap | Mar 30, 1928 –Apr 5, 1928
| colspan=3 | Vacant

|- style="height:2em"
| Appointed to continue Willis's term.Lost nomination to finish Willis's term.
| nowrap | Apr 5, 1928 –Dec 14, 1928
|  | Democratic
| align=right | Cyrus Locher
! 24

|- style="height:2em"
| rowspan=2 | Elected to finish Willis's term.Died.
| rowspan=2 nowrap | Dec 15, 1928 –Oct 28, 1929
| rowspan=2  | Republican
| rowspan=2 align=right | Theodore E. Burton
! rowspan=2 | 25

|- style="height:2em"
| rowspan=6 | Re-elected in 1928.Lost re-election.
| rowspan=6 | 22
| 

|- style="height:2em"
|  
| nowrap | Oct 28, 1929 –Nov 5, 1929
| colspan=3 | Vacant

|- style="height:2em"
| Appointed to continue Burton's term.Lost election to finish Burton's term.
| nowrap | Nov 5, 1929 –Nov 30, 1930
|  | Republican
| align=right | Roscoe C. McCulloch
! 26

|- style="height:2em"
| rowspan=2 | Elected in 1930 to finish Burton's term.
| rowspan=5 nowrap | Dec 1, 1930 –Jan 3, 1939
| rowspan=5  | Democratic
| rowspan=5 align=right | Robert J. Bulkley
! rowspan=5 | 27

|- style="height:2em"
| 

|- style="height:2em"
| 
| rowspan=3 | 23
| rowspan=3 | Re-elected in 1932.Lost re-election.

|- style="height:2em"
! rowspan=3 | 17
| rowspan=3 align=left | A. Victor Donahey
| rowspan=3  | Democratic
| rowspan=3 nowrap | Jan 3, 1935 –Jan 3, 1941
| rowspan=3 | Elected in 1934.Retired.
| rowspan=3 | 23
| 

|- style="height:2em"
| 

|- style="height:2em"
| 
| rowspan=3 | 24
| rowspan=3 | Elected in 1938.
| rowspan=11 nowrap | Jan 3, 1939 –Jul 31, 1953
| rowspan=11  | Republican
| rowspan=11 align=right | Robert A. Taft
! rowspan=11 | 28

|- style="height:2em"
! rowspan=3 | 18
| rowspan=3 align=left | Harold Hitz Burton
| rowspan=3  | Republican
| rowspan=3 nowrap | Jan 3, 1941 –Sep 30, 1945
| rowspan=3 | Elected in 1940.Resigned when appointed to the U.S. Supreme Court.
| rowspan=6 | 24
| 

|- style="height:2em"
| 

|- style="height:2em"
| 
| rowspan=6 | 25
| rowspan=6 | Re-elected in 1944.

|- style="height:2em"
| colspan=3 | Vacant
| nowrap | Sep 30, 1945 –Oct 8, 1945
|  

|- style="height:2em"
! 19
| align=left | James W. Huffman
|  | Democratic
| nowrap | Oct 8, 1945 –Nov 5, 1946
| Appointed to continue Burton's term.Retired when successor elected.

|- style="height:2em"
! 20
| align=left | Kingsley Taft
|  | Republican
| nowrap | Nov 5, 1946 –Jan 3, 1947
| Elected to finish Burton's term.Retired.

|- style="height:2em"
! rowspan=10 | 21
| rowspan=10 align=left | John W. Bricker
| rowspan=10  | Republican
| rowspan=10 nowrap | Jan 3, 1947 –Jan 3, 1959
| rowspan=3 | Elected in 1946.
| rowspan=3 | 25
| 

|- style="height:2em"
| 

|- style="height:2em"
| 
| rowspan=7 | 26
| rowspan=2|Re-elected in 1950.Died.

|- style="height:2em"
| rowspan=7 | Re-elected in 1952.Lost re-election.
| rowspan=7 | 26
| 

|- style="height:2em"
|  
| nowrap | Jul 31, 1953 –Nov 10, 1953
| colspan=3 | Vacant

|- style="height:2em"
| Appointed to continue Taft's term.Lost election to finish Taft's term.
| nowrap | Nov 10, 1953 –Dec 2, 1954
|  | Democratic
| align=right | Thomas Burke
! 29

|- style="height:2em"
|  
| nowrap | Dec 2, 1954 –Dec 16, 1954
| colspan=3 | Vacant

|- style="height:2em"
| rowspan=2 | Elected to finish Taft's term.Lost re-election.
| rowspan=2 nowrap | Dec 16, 1954 –Jan 3, 1957
| rowspan=2  | Republican
| rowspan=2 align=right | George H. Bender
! rowspan=2 |30

|- style="height:2em"
| 

|- style="height:2em"
| 
| rowspan=3 | 27
| rowspan=3 | Elected in 1956.
| rowspan=6 nowrap | Jan 3, 1957 –Jan 3, 1969
| rowspan=6  | Democratic
| rowspan=6 align=right | Frank Lausche
! rowspan=6 | 31

|- style="height:2em"
! rowspan=6 | 22
| rowspan=6 align=left | Stephen M. Young
| rowspan=6  | Democratic
| rowspan=6 nowrap | Jan 3, 1959 –Jan 3, 1971
| rowspan=3 | Elected in 1958.
| rowspan=3 | 27
| 

|- style="height:2em"
| 

|- style="height:2em"
| 
| rowspan=3 | 28
| rowspan=3 | Re-elected in 1962.Lost renomination.

|- style="height:2em"
| rowspan=3 | Re-elected in 1964.Retired.
| rowspan=3 | 28
| 

|- style="height:2em"
| 

|- style="height:2em"
| 
| rowspan=5 | 29
| rowspan=3 | Elected in 1968.Resigned to become U.S. Attorney General.
| rowspan=3 nowrap | Jan 3, 1969 –Jan 3, 1974
| rowspan=3  | Republican
| rowspan=3 align=right | William Saxbe
! rowspan=3 | 32

|- style="height:2em"
! rowspan=5 | 23
| rowspan=5 align=left | Robert Taft Jr.
| rowspan=5  | Republican
| rowspan=5 nowrap | Jan 3, 1971 –Dec 28, 1976
| rowspan=5 | Elected in 1970.Lost re-election and resigned early.
| rowspan=6 | 29
| 

|- style="height:2em"
| 

|- style="height:2em"
| Appointed to finish Saxbe's term.Lost nomination to full term and resigned early.
| nowrap | Jan 4, 1974 –Dec 23, 1974
|  | Democratic
| align=right | Howard Metzenbaum
! 33

|- style="height:2em"
| Appointed early to finish Saxbe's term, having been elected to the next term.
| rowspan=14 nowrap | Dec 24, 1974 –Jan 3, 1999
| rowspan=14  | Democratic
| rowspan=14 align=right | John Glenn
! rowspan=14 | 34

|- style="height:2em"
| 
| rowspan=4 | 30
| rowspan=4 | Elected in 1974.

|- style="height:2em"
! rowspan=10 | 24
| rowspan=10 align=left | Howard Metzenbaum
| rowspan=10  | Democratic
| rowspan=10 nowrap | Dec 29, 1976 –Jan 3, 1995
| Appointed to finish Taft's term, having been elected to the next term.

|- style="height:2em"
| rowspan=3 | Elected in 1976.
| rowspan=3 | 30
| 

|- style="height:2em"
| 

|- style="height:2em"
| 
| rowspan=3 | 31
| rowspan=3 | Re-elected in 1980.

|- style="height:2em"
| rowspan=3 | Re-elected in 1982.
| rowspan=3 | 31
| 

|- style="height:2em"
| 

|- style="height:2em"
| 
| rowspan=3 | 32
| rowspan=3 | Re-elected in 1986.

|- style="height:2em"
| rowspan=3 | Re-elected in 1988.Retired.
| rowspan=3 | 32
| 

|- style="height:2em"
| 

|- style="height:2em"
| 
| rowspan=3 | 33
| rowspan=3 | Re-elected in 1992.Retired.

|- style="height:2em"
! rowspan=6 | 25
| rowspan=6 align=left | Mike DeWine
| rowspan=6  | Republican
| rowspan=6 nowrap | Jan 3, 1995 –Jan 3, 2007
| rowspan=3 | Elected in 1994.
| rowspan=3 | 33
| 

|- style="height:2em"
| 

|- style="height:2em"
| 
| rowspan=3 | 34
| rowspan=3 | Elected in 1998.
| rowspan=6 nowrap | Jan 3, 1999 –Jan 3, 2011
| rowspan=6  | Republican
| rowspan=6 align=right | George Voinovich
! rowspan=6 | 35

|- style="height:2em"
| rowspan=3 | Re-elected in 2000.Lost re-election.
| rowspan=3 | 34
| 

|- style="height:2em"
| 

|- style="height:2em"
| 
| rowspan=3 | 35
| rowspan=3 | Re-elected in 2004.Retired.

|- style="height:2em"
! rowspan=9 | 26
| rowspan=9 align=left | Sherrod Brown
| rowspan=9  | Democratic
| rowspan=9 nowrap | Jan 3, 2007 –present
| rowspan=3 | Elected in 2006.
| rowspan=3 | 35
| 

|- style="height:2em"
| 

|- style="height:2em"
| 
| rowspan=3 | 36
| rowspan=3 | Elected in 2010.
| rowspan=6 nowrap | Jan 3, 2011 –Jan 3, 2023
| rowspan=6  | Republican
| rowspan=6 align=right | Rob Portman
! rowspan=6 | 36

|- style="height:2em"
| rowspan=3 | Re-elected in 2012.
| rowspan=3 | 36
| 

|- style="height:2em"
| 

|- style="height:2em"
| 
| rowspan=3 | 37
| rowspan=3 | Re-elected in 2016.Retired.

|- style="height:2em"
| rowspan=3| Re-elected in 2018.
| rowspan=3 | 37
| 

|- style="height:2em"
| 

|- style="height:2em"
| 
| rowspan=3 | 38
| rowspan=3 | Elected in 2022.
| rowspan=3 | Jan 3, 2023 –present
| rowspan=3  | Republican
| rowspan=3 align=right | J. D. Vance
! rowspan=3 | 37

|- style="height:2em"
| rowspan=3 colspan=5 | To be determined in the 2024 election.
| rowspan=3 | 38
| 

|- style="height:2em"
| 

|- style="height:2em"
| 
| 38
| colspan=5 | To be determined in the 2028 election.

See also

 List of United States representatives from Ohio
 List of United States Senate elections in Ohio
 United States congressional delegations from Ohio

Notes

References 
 
 

United States senators from Ohio
Ohio
United States senators